The women's 3000 metres event  at the 1995 IAAF World Indoor Championships was held on 12 March.

Results

References

3000
3000 metres at the World Athletics Indoor Championships
1995 in women's athletics